The 17th European Women's Artistic Gymnastics Championships was held in Brussels, Belgium, on 20-21 May 1989.

Medalists

References 

1989
European Artistic Gymnastics Championships
1989 in European sport
International gymnastics competitions hosted by Belgium
1989 in Belgian sport